Macarena Eugenia Santelices Cañas (born 15 August 1977) is a Chilean politician and journalist.

References

External links

1977 births
Living people
Chilean people
University of Alcalá alumni
Viña del Mar University alumni
21st-century Chilean politicians
Independent Democratic Union politicians
Ministers of Women and Gender Equality of Chile
Women government ministers of Chile